Igor Vyacheslavovich Turchin (born 13 May 1982) is a Russian former fencer, team World champion in 2003. He competed in the individual and team épée events at the 2004 Summer Olympics.

References

External links
  (archive)
  (archive)
 
 
 

1982 births
Living people
Russian male épée fencers
Olympic fencers of Russia
Fencers at the 2004 Summer Olympics
Universiade medalists in fencing
Sportspeople from Saratov
Universiade bronze medalists for Russia
Medalists at the 2003 Summer Universiade
21st-century Russian people